Extras is a compilation by the British group The Jam. Released in April 1992 it includes 26 B-sides, rarities, and unreleased tracks.

11 of these songs (tracks 1,2,4,5,6,14,16,17,18,19,25) were released on the box set Direction Reaction Creation, making the other 15 tracks exclusive to this release.

Track listing
"The Dreams of Children" (Double A-side to the single "Going Underground")
"Tales from the Riverbank" (B-side to "Absolute Beginners")
"Liza Radley" (Demo)
"Move on Up" (B-side to "Beat Surrender" and a cover of the Curtis Mayfield song)
"Shopping" (B-side to "Beat Surrender")
"Smithers-Jones" (Band version) (B-side of "When You're Young")
"Pop Art Poem" (Demo version)
"Boy About Town" (Alternate version)
"A Solid Bond in Your Heart" (Demo, later released as a single by The Style Council.  An alternate demo of this song appears on "Direction Reaction Creation".)
"No One in the World" (Demo)
"And Your Bird Can Sing" (Demo; a cover of The Beatles song)
"Burning Sky" (Demo)
"Thick As Thieves" (Demo)
"Disguises" (B-side to "Funeral Pyre" and a cover of The Who song)
"Get Yourself Together" (Demo; a cover of the track originally recorded by The Small Faces)
"The Butterfly Collector" (B-side to "Strange Town")
"The Great Depression" (B-side to "Just Who Is the 5 O'Clock Hero?")
"Stoned Out of My Mind" (B-side to "Beat Surrender" and a cover of the song by The Chi-Lites)
"Pity Poor Alfie/Fever" (B-side to "The Bitterest Pill (I Ever Had to Swallow)")
"But I'm Different Now" (Demo)
"I Got You (I Feel Good)" (Demo; a cover of the James Brown song)
"Hey Mister" (Previously unavailable)
"Saturday's Kids" (Demo)
"We've Only Started" (Previously unavailable)
"So Sad About Us" (B-side to "Down in the Tube Station at Midnight" and a cover by the track by The Who)
"The Eton Rifles" (Demo)

Personnel
 Rick Buckler – drums
 Bruce Foxton – bass, vocals
 Paul Weller – guitar, vocals

Other personnel
 Vic Coppersmith-Heaven – producer
 Paolo Hewitt – liner notes
 The Jam – producer
 Dennis Munday – compilation, research
 Tony Taverner – producer
 Peter Wilson – producer, remixing

References

The Jam albums
B-side compilation albums
1992 compilation albums
Polydor Records compilation albums